Jenny Visser-Hooft (née Jkvr Jeannette Hooft 18 June 1888, Kensington - 16 September 1939, Ankara) was a Dutch traveler, mountaineer, and writer known for the flora and fauna research she did in the 1920s with her husband, Philips Christiaan Visser, in Pakistan and India's Karakorum Glaciers region.

Visser-Hooft was the daughter of Jhr Maurits Wijnand Hendrik Hooft and Jeannette Henriëtte Grader van der Maas, and was a descendant of P.C. Hooft. She married the geographer and diplomat Philips Visser (1882-1955) in 1912 in The Hague. She was a member of the Royal Netherlands Geographical Society, and of the Dutch Alpine Club, as well as serving as Vice-President of the Ladies' Alpine Club.

Selected works
''Among the Kara-Korum Glaciers in 1925 (1926)

References

Sources

External links

1888 births
1939 deaths
Female travelers
Dutch mountain climbers
20th-century Dutch writers
Dutch women writers
20th-century women writers
Dutch expatriates in the United Kingdom